The Texaco Service Station, at 201 W. 4th Ave. in Bristow, Oklahoma, was built in 1923.  It was listed on the National Register of Historic Places in 1995.

It is an L-shaped stuccoed building on the northwest corner of Fourth Street (U.S. Route 66) and Elm St.

References

Gas stations on the National Register of Historic Places in Oklahoma
National Register of Historic Places in Creek County, Oklahoma
Moderne architecture in Oklahoma
Buildings and structures completed in 1923
U.S. Route 66 in Oklahoma
1923 establishments in Oklahoma
Texaco